Harpalus aeneipennis is a species of ground beetle in the subfamily Harpalinae. It was described by Faldermann in 1836.

References

aeneipennis
Beetles described in 1836